Paltoloma is a genus of moths in the family Gelechiidae. It contains the species Paltoloma paleata, which is found in the Democratic Republic of Congo (Equateur).

References

Gelechiinae
Moth genera
Endemic fauna of the Democratic Republic of the Congo